The 2000–01 season was the 56th season in the history of VfL Wolfsburg and their fourth consecutive season in the top flight. The club participated in the Bundesliga, the DFB-Pokal and the UEFA Intertoto Cup.

Pre-season and friendlies

Competitions

Overall record

Bundesliga

League table

Results summary

Results by round

Matches

DFB-Pokal

UEFA Intertoto Cup

Third round

Semi-finals

References 

VfL Wolfsburg seasons
Wolfsburg